The 2016–17 Arkansas State Red Wolves men's basketball team represented Arkansas State University during the 2016–17 NCAA Division I men's basketball season. The Red Wolves, led by first-year head coach Grant McCasland, played their home games at the Convocation Center in Jonesboro, Arkansas as members of the Sun Belt Conference. They finished the season 20–12, 11–7 in Sun Belt play to finish in a three-way tie for third place. As the No. 5 seed in the Sun Belt tournament, they lost to Louisiana–Monroe in the first round. Despite having 20 wins, they did not participate in a postseason tournament.

On March 13, 2017, head coach Grant McCasland left the school to accept the head coaching position at North Texas. On March 20, the school named Louisville assistant Mike Balado as their new head coach.

Previous season
The Red Wolves finished the 2015–16 season 11–20, 7–13 in Sun Belt play to finish in a tie for ninth place. They failed to qualify for the Sun Belt tournament.

Prior to the season, head coach John Brady announced his intentions to resign following the season. On March 16, 2016, the school hired former Baylor assistant Grant McCasland as the new head coach.

Roster

Schedule and results

|-
!colspan=9 style=| Exhibition
 
 
|-
!colspan=9 style=| Non-conference regular season

 

 
 

|-
!colspan=9 style=| Sun Belt Conference regular season

|-
!colspan=9 style=| Sun Belt tournament

References

Arkansas State Red Wolves men's basketball seasons
Arkansas State